Satao (c. 1968 – 30 May 2014) was one of Kenya's largest African elephants. He was known as a tusker because his tusks were so long that they almost touched the ground. The Tsavo Trust announced that Satao was killed by poachers using a poisoned arrow on 30 May 2014.

Background
Satao was an African elephant that lived in Tsavo East National Park, one of the largest wildlife parks in the world with a large population of elephants. He was thought to have been born during the late 1960s and to have been at least 45 years old when he was killed. He was estimated to be one of the largest elephants in the world at the time of his death and has been described as one of Kenya's most iconic and well-known tuskers (i.e., male elephants with tusks that almost reach the ground). More than half of all of the remaining African big tuskers are in Kenya.

Elephant ivory poaching is a widespread problem in Africa. In 2013, over 20,000 African elephants were killed for their ivory. The slaughter of African elephants is driven by the black market value of elephant ivory. The illicit trade in ivory is primarily in Asia where ivory sells for several thousands of dollars per kilogram. Satao's tusks were estimated to weigh more than  each.

Since 2007, the illegal trade in ivory had doubled. While China is the largest market, the United States, Thailand, Vietnam, and the Philippines are also top markets for illegal ivory. The increase in poaching is driven in large part by organised crime and rebel groups seeking ways to fund insurgencies in Africa.

Due to the great value of his tusks on the black market, Satao had been under nearly constant surveillance by the Kenya Wildlife Service (KWS) and the Tsavo trust for the 18 months prior to June 2014. He typically remained in a small area of the park, but had started roaming into areas of the park where poaching was high. Because he roamed into a large , a dangerous area for poaching with thick vegetation, and because of the constant poaching attempts driven by organised crime and rebel militias, the KWS and the Tsavo Trust could not prevent poachers from reaching Satao.

Also, Satao was featured in the Apple TV+ original The Elephant Queen. However, during filming of the documentary, Satao was killed by the poachers.

Death
In March 2014, Satao was found with two seeping wounds in his flank from poisoned arrows shot into him, which were confirmed by veterinarians who rushed to the scene to treat him.  After a number of days, Satao recovered from his festering wounds. Satao was last spotted alive on 19 May 2014.

On 2 June 2014, Richard Moller of the Tsavo Trust found a huge elephant carcass lying in a swamp near the boundary of Tsavo East National Park. The tusks had been cut off and the face was badly mutilated, so the carcass could not be identified with certainty at that time. For about 10 days, Moller and Kenya Wildlife Service searched for Satao before concluding that he was dead. He was killed by a poisoned arrow shot deep into his left flank on 30 May 2014.

Satao was officially declared dead on 13 June, 2014 and the Tsavo Trust released the following statement announcing his death:

Satao was a victim of the illegal ivory trade where ivory is commonly poached and sold by terrorist organizations to China, which has the largest market for ivory in the world.

Arrests
On 20 June 2014, Kenya Wildlife Services reported that service rangers arrested three suspects for killing Satao. Paul Muya, a spokesperson for the Kenya Wildlife Services, said that they were tracked down based on intelligence the Service had acquired.

Public response 
The death of Satao resulted in a public outpouring of support for policy to reduce poaching. In New Orleans, a TV Show was created named "AWE for Awesome Wildlife Effort" to interview artists, such as Anne London, on educating the public regarding endangered species. A unit called "The Great Tuskers of AWE" was created to march in Mardi Gras parades with a large fiberglass elephant float and The Krewe of Tusk and Horn marched on World Animal Day in the French Quarter. In neighboring Kenner, Louisiana, a 16-foot tall elephant sculpture was erected.

See also
Killing of Cecil the lion
Elephant hunting in Kenya
List of individual elephants
Isilo (elephant)

References

External links
Tsavo East National Park
Tsavo Trust

Elephant conservation
Individual elephants
2014 animal deaths
Individual wild animals